Natacha is a Belgian comics series, created by François Walthéry and Gos. Drawn by Walthéry, its stories have been written by several authors including Gos, Peyo, Maurice Tillieux, Raoul Cauvin and Marc Wasterlain.

Synopsis
The series tells the adventures of Natacha, a young sexy flight attendant, and her clumsy, hot-tempered colleague and friend Walter.

Publication history
Natacha was first published in the Franco-Belgian comics magazine Spirou on February 26, 1970. The series eventually ended serial publication in Spirou, leaving its publisher Dupuis, and began publishing albums only through Marsu Productions in 1989, starting with the album Cauchemirage.

List of volumes

Albums by Dupuis

Albums by Marsu Productions

Publications in magazines
Natacha, hôtesse de l'air (written by Gos), in Spirou n°1663 (February 26, 1970) - 1690 (March 3, 1970)
À un cheveux de la catastrophe (written by Gos), in Spirou n°1682 (July 9, 1970)
L'étoile du berger (written by Gos), in Spirou n°1706 (December 24, 1970)
Natacha et le Maharadjah (written by Gos), in Spirou n°1747 (July 7, 1971) - 1765 (February 10, 1972)
Un brin de panique (written by Marc Wasterlain), in Spirou n°1834 (7 juin 1973) à 1840 (19 juillet 1973)
La mémoire de métal (written by d'Étienne Borgers and François Walthéry), in Spirou n°1849 (September 20, 1973) - 1860 (December 6, 1973)
Natacha et la science-friction (written by J. Baert), in Spirou n°1860 (December 6, 1973)
Un trône pour Natacha (written by Maurice Tillieux), in Spirou n°1893 (July 27, 1974) - 1912 (December 5, 1974)
Double vol (written by Mittéï), in Spirou n°1928 (March 27, 1975) - 1937 (May 29, 1975)
-->

Sources

 Natacha publications in Spirou BDoubliées 
 Natacha albums Bedetheque 

Footnotes

External links
Natacha on Les Belles des bédés (Cartoon Beauties) 

Belgian comics characters
Belgian comic strips
1970 comics debuts
Belgian comics titles
Dupuis titles
Fictional Belgian people
Fictional flight attendants
Aviation comics
Adventure comics
Humor comics
Comics characters introduced in 1970
Comics about women
Comics set in Belgium
Female characters in comics
Works about flight attendants